This list is of the Cultural Properties of Japan designated in the category of  for the Prefecture of Ehime.

National Cultural Properties
As of 1 July 2019, one Important Cultural Property has been designated, being of national significance.

Prefectural Cultural Properties
As of 23 July 2019, fourteen properties have been designated at a prefectural level.

See also
 Cultural Properties of Japan
 List of National Treasures of Japan (paintings)
 Japanese painting
 List of Historic Sites of Japan (Ehime)

References

External links
  Cultural Properties in Ehime Prefecture

Cultural Properties,Ehime
Cultural Properties,Paintings
Paintings,Ehime
Lists of paintings